The 2007–08 Slovenian Second League season started on 12 August 2007 and ended on 31 May 2008. Each team played a total of 27 matches.

Clubs

League standing

See also
2007–08 Slovenian PrvaLiga
2007–08 Slovenian Third League

References
NZS archive

External links
Football Association of Slovenia 

Slovenian Second League seasons
2007–08 in Slovenian football
Slovenia